Mabergs is a surname, originating from Sweden. Notable people with the surname include:

Joakim Mabergs (Joakim Carlsson) (born 1972), Swedish curler
Mathias Mabergs (Mathias Carlsson) (born 1975), Swedish curler and coach
Mats Mabergs (born 1962), Swedish curler and coach
Patric Mabergs (born 1992), Swedish curler
Sofia Mabergs (born 1993), Swedish curler, 2018 Winter Olympic champion